The 1995 Japan Open Tennis Championships was a combined men's and women's tennis tournament played on outdoor hard courts at the Ariake Coliseum in Tokyo in Japan that was part of the Championship Series of the 1995 ATP Tour and of Tier III of the 1995 WTA Tour. It was the 22nd edition of the tournament and was held from 10 April through 16 April 1995. Jim Courier and Amy Frazier won the singles titles.

Finals

Men's singles

 Jim Courier defeated  Andre Agassi 6–3, 6–4
 It was Courier's 4th title of the year and the 22nd of his career.

Women's singles

 Amy Frazier defeated  Kimiko Date 7–6, 7–5
 It was Frazier's only title of the year and the 8th of her career.

Men's doubles

 Mark Knowles /  Jonathan Stark defeated  John Fitzgerald /  Anders Järryd 6–3, 3–6, 7–6
 It was Knowles' 1st title of the year and the 3rd of his career. It was Stark's 2nd title of the year and the 14th of his career.

Women's doubles

 Miho Saeki /  Yuka Yoshida defeated  Kyoko Nagatsuka /  Ai Sugiyama 6–7, 6–4, 7–6
 It was Saeki's only title of the year and the 1st of her career. It was Yoshida's only title of the year and the 1st of her career.

References

External links
 Official website
 ATP tournament profile

 
Japan Open Tennis Championships
Japan Open Tennis Championships
Japan Open (tennis)
Japan Open Tennis Championships
Japan Open Tennis Championships